Q94 may refer to:

Radio stations
 CHIQ. Q94 in Winnipeg, Manitoba
 WRVQ, Q94 in Richmond, Virginia
 WBXQ, Q94 in Altoona, Pennsylvania
 KQXY, Q94 in Beaumont, Texas
 KLVQ, Q94 in Mount Pleasant, Texas

Other uses 
 Al-Inshirah, the 94th surah of the Quran